Sol Filosofia is the second studio album by Kenyan afro-pop band Sauti Sol. It was released on February 25, 2011 by Penya Records, and launched at the Alliance française in Nairobi.

The album's two singles "Soma Kijana" and "Coming Home" also had music videos released, with that of the latter featuring

Singles
 "Soma Kijana" was released as the album's lead single. It urges all youth to take education seriously and read. The song's genre was inspired by one of Sauti Sol's biggest inspirations, the late Daudi Kabaka.
 "Coming Home" was released as the album's second single. A music video for the song was released on 13 April 2011, and featured singer and reality star Patricia Kihoro. In the video, guitarist Polycarp Otieno finds himself rejected by his girlfriend soon after the band returns home from tour, pushing him to take his own life as his fellow band members try to save him. A sequel of the song is said to be in production. The song won the Best Music Video award at the 2011 Kisima Music Awards.

Track listing
Track listing for Sol Filosofia adapted from Amazon.com.

References

2011 albums
Sauti Sol albums
Swahili-language albums
Albums produced by Sauti Sol